Cambodia's Got Talent is a Cambodian televised talent competition, and is part of the global Got Talent franchise created by Simon Cowell. The program premiered on Hang Meas HDTV on 30 November 2014 and is presented by Nhem Sokun and Per Chamrong.

The program attracts a variety of participants, from across Cambodia, to take part and who possess some form of talents, with acts ranging from singing, dancing, comedy, magic, stunts, variety, and other genres. Each participant who auditions attempts to secure a place in the live episodes of a season by impressing a panel of judges - consists of Neay Koy, Preap Sovath, Khat Sokhim and Neay Krem. Those that make it into the live episodes compete against each other for both the judges' and public's vote in order to reach the live final, where the winner receives a large cash prize.

Format

Auditions 
Each year's competition begins with a set of audition stages, the first of which is conducted by production teams across various cities in Cambodia. This stage is open to all forms of acts and judged by an independent group, and thus determines who will take part in the next stage of auditions titled "Judges' Auditions" - these are held in a public venue within select cities across the country and are attended by the judges handling that year's contest.

Each participant that reaches this stage of auditions is held offstage from the main performing area in a waiting room, and given a number that denotes when they will perform. Upon being called before the judges, the participant is given 90 seconds to demonstrate their act, with a live audience present for all performances. Each judge is given a buzzer, and may use it during a performance if they are unimpressed, hate what is being performed, or feel the act is a waste of their time; if a participant is buzzed by all judges, their performance is automatically over. At the end of a performance, the judges give constructive criticism and feedback about what they saw, whereupon they each give a vote - a participant requires a majority vote approving their performance to proceed to the next stage, otherwise they are eliminated from the program at that stage. Many acts that move on may be cut by producers and may be forced to forfeit their place due to the limited slots available for the next stage. Filming for each season always begins when the Judges' Auditions are taking place, with the show's presenter standing in the wings of each venue's stage to interview and give personal commentary on a participant's performance.

In addition, during the auditions, the "Golden Buzzer" is placed on the center of the judging panel. During auditions, each judge is allowed to use the Golden Buzzer to send an act automatically into the live shows, regardless of the opinion of the other judges; when it was initially used, the buzzer simply saved an act from elimination. The only rule to the buzzer was that a judge could use it only once per season.

Semi-finals and Final 
Contestants who make it into the semi-finals by passing the auditions or receiving a Golden Buzzer, are divided into groups for each round, where they must perform before the audience and judges, as well as on live television. As with the audition stage, each semi-finalist must conduct a performance before the judges – a new routine of their act – with the judges' role being to watch what is conducted and give feedback towards the end of the performance; buzzers may still be used by each judge, and the performance can be ultimately terminated if all buzzers are used. Because all semi-finalists are performing live, they are given time to prepare in advance with rehearsals, while production staff can provide assistance to those in preparing their performance – in the case of those conducting routines that incorporate a level of risk, production staff will ensure precautions are in place, including paramedics, and sometimes set up off-site venues for performances to use either live or for a pre-recorded film for the episode's live broadcast.

Each semi-final can only have two participants advance into the final, and these are determined by public vote – via a special SMS message, consists of a two-digit number correspond to each semi-finalist – that takes place once all semi-finalists have performed and during a break in the semi-final to allow for votes to be made. Once the vote period is ended and the results counted and fully verified, two semi-finalists with the highest total of votes secures their place in the final.

The finals operate in a similar manner to the semi-finals, though all participants in this stage compete primarily to win votes from the public with a new routine; the judges can still buzz and give opinions on the performance they view, but have little impact on the public's voting intention. Once the public vote has been completed, once all finalists have performed, and the votes verified and counted, the hosts announce who is placed as the top two acts of the vote, before revealing the winner who received the most votes from the public. Finalists who win receive a large cash prize.

Season 1

Season 1 aired from November 30, 2014, to March 5, 2015, and was hosted by Nhem Sokun and Per Chamrong. On the judging panel for this series, there were Neay Koy, Preap Sovath and Khat Sokhim. The first season was won by 16-year-old blind singer Yoeun Pisey.

Season 2 
Season 2 premiered in June 2018 and was hosted by Chea Vibol and San Visal. On the judging panel for this series, there were Neay Koy, Khat Sokhim, Preap Sovath and Neay Krem. Neay Krem joined as a new judge aka the fourth judge. The second season was won by dance crew The Kings.

Series summary

References 

Got Talent
2014 Cambodian television series debuts
2015 Cambodian television series endings
2010s reality television series
Cambodian television series
Non-British television series based on British television series
2010s Cambodian television series
Hang Meas HDTV original programming